is a district located in Kumamoto Prefecture, Japan.

In 2003 the district had an estimated population of 64,552 and a density of 48.64 persons per square kilometer. The total area is 1,327.16 km2.

History

Economy
Kuma District is noted for its many shōchū distilleries.

Culture
At social settings such as a party one presents one's empty cup to a friend to hold, into which one then pours some beverage for the friend to drink. After the friend finishes the drink he returns the glass and fills it with more of the beverage.

Language
The local dialect is called Kuma-ben.

Towns and villages
Asagiri
Nishiki
Taragi
Yunomae
Itsuki
Kuma
Mizukami
Sagara
Yamae

Merger
On April 1, 2003 the town of Menda, and the villages of Fukada, Ōkaharu, Sue and Ue merged to form the new town of Asagiri.

References

Districts in Kumamoto Prefecture